The 2011 UCLA Bruins baseball team represented the University of California, Los Angeles in the 2011 NCAA Division I baseball season.  The team played their home games in Jackie Robinson Stadium.  The Bruins finished the season with a 35–24 overall record, and won the Pacific-10 Conference Championship with 18 wins and 9 losses.  The team automatically qualified for the 2011 NCAA Division I baseball tournament, and were seeded #1 in the Los Angeles Regional. The Bruins lost the first game of the double-elimination format to the San Francisco Dons, 0–3.  They then beat Fresno State 3–1 and San Francisco 4–1 to reach the regional finals.  UC Irvine was undefeated coming into the game, and UCLA would have to beat them twice in order to become the regional champion.  After beating San Francisco a little over one hour earlier, the Bruins took the field at Jackie Robinson stadium as the visiting team at 6 pm.  The Bruins scored one run each in the 1st, 4th, and 5th innings, and gave up two runs each in the 5th and 9th.  UC Irvine went on to play the Virginia Cavaliers in the Charlottesville Super Regional.

Previous season
UCLA finished the 2010 regular season as the #2 team in the Pacific-10 Conference, and lost to South Carolina in the 2010 College World Series.  Junior pitching aces Trevor Bauer and Gerrit Cole, along with 18 other lettermen, returned from last year's team to play for the 2011 team.

Roster

Schedule

! style="background:#536895;color:#FFB300;"| Regular Season
|- valign="top"

|- bgcolor="#ccffcc"
| 1 || February 18 || San Francisco || Jackie Robinson Stadium || 1–0 || G. Cole (1–0) || M. Lujan (0–1) || None || 623 || 1–0 || –
|- bgcolor="#ccffcc"
| 2 || February 19 || San Francisco || Jackie Robinson Stadium || 4–1 || T. Bauer (1–0) || K. Zimmer (0–1) || N. Vander Tuig (1) || 645 || 2–0 ||–
|- bgcolor="#ccffcc"
| 3 || February 20 || San Francisco || Jackie Robinson Stadium || 3–0 || A. Plutko (1–0) || M. Hiserman (0–1) || N. Vander Tuig (2) || 917 || 3–0 || –
|- bgcolor="#ccffcc"
| 4 || February 22 || Pepperdine || Jackie Robinson Stadium || 9–0 || S. Griggs (1–0) || M. Maurer (0–1) || None || 567 || 4–0 ||–
|- bgcolor="#FFE6E6"
| 5 || February 26 || San Jose State || Jackie Robinson Stadium || 3–5 || R. Padilla (2–0) || T. Bauer (1–1) || None || 566 || 4–1 ||–
|- bgcolor="#FFE6E6"
| 6 || February 27 || San Jose State || Jackie Robinson Stadium || 3–8 || B. McFarland (1–0) || G. Cole (1–1) || None || 703 || 4–2 ||–
|- bgcolor="#ccffcc"
| 7 || February 27 || San Jose State || Jackie Robinson Stadium || 12–2 || A. Plutko (2–0) || A. Hennessey || None || 703 || 5–2 ||–
|-

|- bgcolor="#ccffcc"
| 8 || March 1 || San Diego State || Tony Gwynn Stadium || 5–2 || Z. Weiss (1–0) || B. Crabb (0–2) || None || 790 || 6–2 || –
|- bgcolor="#ccffcc"
| 9 || March 4 || Nebraska || Hawks Field || 1–0 11 || N. Vander Tuig (1–0) || C. Hauptman (1–1) || None || 1,120 || 7–2 ||–
|- bgcolor="#FFE6E6"
| 10 || March 5 || Nebraska || Hawks Field || 1–2 12 || || || || || 7–3 || –
|- bgcolor="#FFE6E6"
| 11 || March 6 || Nebraska || Hawks Field || 4–5 11 || || || || || 7–4 ||–
|- bgcolor="#FFE6E6"
| 12 || March 11 || Georgia || Jackie Robinson Stadium || 2–6 || || || || || 7–5 ||–
|- bgcolor="#ccffcc"
| 13 || March 12 || St. Mary's || Jackie Robinson Stadium || 10–2 || || || || || 8–5 ||–
|- bgcolor="#FFE6E6"
| 14 || March 13 || USC || Dodgers Stadium || 0–2 || || || || || 8–6 || –
|- align="center" bgcolor=
| – || March 20 || Cal Poly || San Luis Obispo, CA || Canceled || || || || || 8–6 ||–
|- bgcolor="#FFE6E6"
| 15 || March 21 || Cal Poly || San Luis Obispo, CA || 1–2 || || || || || 8–7 ||–
|- bgcolor="#ccffcc"
| 16 || March 21 || Cal Poly || San Luis Obispo, CA || 8–0 || || || || || 9–7 ||–
|- bgcolor="#ccffcc"
| 17 || March 25 || USC || Dedeaux Field || 8–4 || || || || || 10–7 || 1–0
|- bgcolor="#ccffcc"
| 18 || March 26 || USC || Dedeaux Field || 4–0 || || || || || 11–7 || 2–0
|- bgcolor="#FFE6E6"
| 19 || March 27 || USC || Dedeaux Field || 2–6 || || || || || 11–8 || 2–1
|- bgcolor="#FFE6E6"
| 20 || March 29 || Cal State Fullerton || Goodwin Field || 3–5 || || || || || 11–9 ||2–1
|-

|- bgcolor="#ccffcc"
| 21 || April 1 || Washington || Jackie Robinson Stadium || 2–1 || || || || || 12–9 || 3–1
|- bgcolor="#ccffcc"
| 22 || April 2 || Washington || Jackie Robinson Stadium || 5–3 || || || || || 13–9 || 4–1
|- bgcolor="#ccffcc"
| 23 || April 3 || Washington || Jackie Robinson Stadium || 3–2 || || || || || 14–9 || 5–1
|- bgcolor="#FFE6E6"
| 24 || April 5 || UC Riverside || Riverside Sports Complex || 4–5 11 || || || || || 14–10 || 5–1
|- bgcolor="#ccffcc"
| 25 || April 8 || Washington State || Bailey-Brayton Field || 3–1 || || || || || 15–10 || 6–1
|- bgcolor="#ccffcc"
| 26 || April 9 || Washington State || Bailey-Brayton Field || 10–3 || || || || || 16–10 || 7–1
|- bgcolor="#FFE6E6"
| 27 || April 10 || Washington State || Bailey-Brayton Field || 2–3 || || || || || 16–11 || 7–2
|- bgcolor="#ccffcc"
| 28 || April 12 || Long Beach State || Jackie Robinson Stadium || 6–4 || Z. Weiss (2–1) || J. Stassi (0–1) || N. Vander Tuig (4) || 513 || 17–11 || 7–2
|- bgcolor="#FFE6E6"
| 29 || April 15 || Arizona || Jackie Robinson Stadium || 4–5 || K. Heyer (6–1) || G. Cole (4–3) || M. Chaffee (4) || 878 || 17–12 ||7–3
|- bgcolor="#ccffcc"
| 30 || April 16 || Arizona || Jackie Robinson Stadium || 4–0 || T. Bauer (7–1) || K. Simon (6–3) || None || 1,057 || 18–12 ||8–3
|- bgcolor="#ccffcc"
| 31 || April 17 || Arizona || Jackie Robinson Stadium || 8–5 || N. Vander Tuig (3–2) || M. Chaffee (4–2) || None || 1,319 || 19–12 ||9–3
|- bgcolor="#ccffcc"
| 32 || April 19 || San Diego State || Jackie Robinson Stadium || 14–6 || Z. Weiss (3–1) || M. Hachadorian (0–3) || None || 622 || 20–12 ||9–3
|- bgcolor="#FFE6E6"
| 33 || April 21 || Stanford || Sunken Diamond || 4–7 || M. Appel (3–4) || G. Cole (4–4) || None || 1,622 || 20–13 ||9–4
|- bgcolor="#ccffcc"
| 34 || April 22 || Stanford || Sunken Diamond ||4-1 || T. Bauer (8–1) || J. Pries (4–4) || None || 1,953 || 21–13 ||10–4
|- bgcolor="#FFE6E6"
| 35 || April 23 || Stanford || Sunken Diamond ||4-5 || C. Reed (2–1) || N. Vander Tuig (3–3) || None || 2,280|| 21–14 ||10–5
|- bgcolor="#ccffcc"
| 36 || April 26 || UC Irvine || Jackie Robinson Stadium || 6–1 || Z. Weiss (4–1) || A. Lines (3–2) || None || 571 || 22–14 ||10–5
|- bgcolor="#FFE6E6"
| 37 || April 29 || Oregon State || Jackie Robinson Stadium || 5–7 || S. Gaviglio (8–1) || G. Cole (4–5) || T. Bryant (7) || 876 || 22–15 ||10–6
|- bgcolor="#FFE6E6"
| 38 || April 30 || Oregon State || Jackie Robinson Stadium || 0–2 || J. Osich (6–1) || T. Bauer (8–2) || None || 1,221 || 22–16 ||10–7
|-

|- bgcolor="#ccffcc"
| 39 || May 1 || Oregon State || Jackie Robinson Stadium || 5–2 || || || || || 23–16 || 11–7
|- bgcolor="#ccffcc"
| 40 || May 3 || Pepperdine || Eddy D. Field Stadium || 10–0 || || || || || 24–16 || 11–7
|- bgcolor="#ccffcc"
| 41 || May 6 || Oregon || PK Park || 7–1 || || || || || 25–16 || 12–7
|- bgcolor="#ccffcc"
| 42 || May 7 || Oregon || PK Park || 3–1 || || || || || 26–16 || 13–7
|- bgcolor="#ccffcc"
| 43 || May 8 || Oregon || PK Park || 4–0 || || || || || 27–16 || 14–7
|- bgcolor="#FFE6E6"
| 44 || May 10 || Long Beach State || Blair Field || 2–4 || || || || || 27–17 || 14–7
|- bgcolor="#FFE6E6"
| 45 || May 11 || UC Santa Barbara || Jackie Robinson Stadium || 4–5 || C. Cuneo (1–0) || S. Griggs (1–1) || B. Fick (1) || 404 || 27–18 || 14–7
|- bgcolor="#FFE6E6"
| 46 || May 13 || Cal State Bakersfield || Jackie Robinson Stadium || 1–5 || || || || || 27–19 || 14–7
|- bgcolor="#ccffcc"
| 47 || May 14 || Cal State Bakersfield || Jackie Robinson Stadium || 10–1 || || || || || 28–19 || 14–7
|- bgcolor="#ccffcc"
| 48 || May 15 || Cal State Bakersfield || Jackie Robinson Stadium || 3–2 || || || || || 29–19 || 14–7
|- align="center" bgcolor=
| – || May 17 || Cal State Fullerton || Jackie Robinson Stadium || Cancelled || || || || || – || –
|- bgcolor="#FFE6E6"
| 49 || May 20 || California || Jackie Robinson Stadium || 0–4 || || || || || 29–20 || 14–8
|- bgcolor="#ccffcc"
| 50 || May 21 || California || Jackie Robinson Stadium || 2–1 || || || || || 30–20 || 15–8
|- bgcolor="#ccffcc"
| 51 || May 22 || California || Jackie Robinson Stadium || 5–2 || || || || || 31–20 || 16–8
|- bgcolor="#FFE6E6"
| 52 || May 24 || UC Irvine || Cicerone Field || 1–2 || || || || || 31–21 || 16–8
|- bgcolor="#ccffcc"
| 53 || May 27 || Arizona State || Packard Stadium || 10–3 || || || || || 32–21 || 17–8
|- bgcolor="#ccffcc"
| 54 || May 28 || Arizona State || Packard Stadium || 7–0 || || || || || 33–21 || 18–8
|- bgcolor="#FFE6E6"
| 55 || May 29 || Arizona State || Packard Stadium || 5–10 || M. Lambson (5–3) || A. Plutko (6–4) || None || 2,889 || 33–22 || 18–9
|-

|-
! style="background:#536895;color:#FFB300;"| Post-Season
|-

|- bgcolor="#FFE6E6"
| 56 || June 3 || San Francisco || Jackie Robinson Stadium || 0–3 || K. Zimmer (6–4) || Gerrit Cole (6–8) || None || 1,925 || 33–23 || 0–1
|- bgcolor="#ccffcc"
| 57 || June 4 || Fresno State || Jackie Robinson Stadium || 3–1 || Trevor Bauer (13–2) || Josh Poytress (7–3) || None || 1,949 || 34–23 || 1–1
|- bgcolor="#ccffcc"
| 58 || June 5 || San Francisco || Jackie Robinson Stadium || 4–1 || A. Plutko (7–4) || J. Abramson (2–3) || N. Vander Tuig (9)  || 1,351 || 35–23 || 2–1
|- bgcolor="#FFE6E6"
| 59 || June 5 || UC Irvine || Jackie Robinson Stadium || 3–4 || P. Ferragamo (2–0) || N. Vander Tuig (3–4) || None || 1,461 || 35–24 || 2–2
|-

Rankings

UCLA Bruins in the 2011 MLB Draft
The following members of the UCLA Bruins baseball program were drafted in the 2011 Major League Baseball Draft.  Gerrit Cole is the first Bruin to be picked #1 overall in the MLB First-Year Player Draft.

Notes
March 28, 2011 – Trevor Bauer was named Louisville Slugger National Player of the Week, fourth time in his career and second time this season.
 April 25, 2011 – Trevor Bauer earned Pac-10 Pitcher of the Week honors for three consecutive weeks.
 May 31, 2011 – Trevor Bauer was named the Pac-10 Pitcher of the Year; Adam Plutko and Beau Amaral were named to the All-Pac-10 First Team. Honorable honors went to Gerrit Cole, Mitchell Beacom, Steve Rodriguez, Cody Keefer and Nick Vander Tuig.
 June 2, 2011 – Trevor Bauer was the Collegiate Baseball Newspaper's National Player of the Year.
 June 3–5, 2011 – UCLA hosted the Los Angeles Regional of the NCAA Division I Baseball Championship at Jackie Robinson Stadium; UCLA lost the first game to San Francisco 3–0 on June 3, 2011.
 June 4, 2011 – The Bruins defeated Fresno State 3–1 in their second game of the Los Angeles Regional.
 June 10, 2011 – Trevor Bauer has been named the District IX Player of the Year, by the National Collegiate Baseball Writers Association (NCBWA).
 June 15, 2011 – Trevor Bauer was named College Player of the Year by Baseball America.
 July 15, 2011 – Bauer was the winner of the 2011 Golden Spikes Award.
 September 30, 2011 – Former players Ben Francisco, Philadelphia Phillies; Ron Roenicke, Milwaukee Brewers and Chase Utley, Philadelphia Phillies are participants in the 2011 MLB Playoffs.

References

Ucla Bruins
UCLA Bruins baseball seasons
Pac-12 Conference baseball champion seasons
UCLA
UCLA